Jim Spence may refer to:

 Jim Spence (broadcaster), Scottish sports broadcaster
 Jim Spence (loyalist) (born 1960), Northern Irish former loyalist activist

See also
 James Spence (disambiguation)